Spermology is the collection of seeds and trivia